The 2000 Summer Olympics, officially the Games of the XXVII Olympiad and also known as Sydney 2000 (Dharug: Gadigal 2000), the Millennium Olympic Games or the Games of the New Millennium, was an international multi-sport event held from 15 September to 1 October 2000 in Sydney, New South Wales, Australia. It marked the second time the Summer Olympics were held in Australia, and in the Southern Hemisphere, the first being in Melbourne, in 1956.

Sydney was selected as the host city for the 2000 Games in 1993. Teams from 199 countries participated in the 2000 Games, which were the first to feature at least 300 events in its official sports programme. The Games' cost was estimated to be A$6.6 billion. These were the final Olympic Games under the IOC presidency of Juan Antonio Samaranch before the arrival of his successor Jacques Rogge. The 2000 Games were the last of the two consecutive Summer Olympics to be held in a predominantly English-speaking country following the 1996 Summer Olympics in Atlanta, United States.

The final medal tally at the 2000 Summer Olympics was led by the United States, followed by Russia and China with host Australia at fourth place overall. Cameroon, Colombia, Latvia, Mozambique and Slovenia won a gold medal for the first time in their Olympic histories, while Barbados, Kuwait, Kyrgyzstan, Macedonia, Saudi Arabia and Vietnam won their first ever Olympic medals. Australia will host the Summer Olympics again in 2032 at Brisbane, Queensland making it the first Oceanian country to host the Olympics three times.

The 2000 Games received universal acclaim, with the organisation, volunteers, sportsmanship, and Australian public being lauded in the international media. Bill Bryson of The Times called the Sydney Games "one of the most successful events on the world stage", saying that they "couldn't be better". James Mossop of the Electronic Telegraph called the Games "such a success that any city considering bidding for future Olympics must be wondering how it can reach the standards set by Sydney", while Jack Todd of the Montreal Gazette suggested that the "IOC should quit while it's ahead. Admit there can never be a better Olympic Games, and be done with it," as "Sydney was both exceptional and the best". These games would provide the inspiration for London's winning bid for the 2012 Olympic Games in 2005; in preparing for the 2012 Games, Lord Coe declared the 2000 Games the "benchmark for the spirit of the Games, unquestionably", admitting that the London organising committee "attempted in a number of ways to emulate what the Sydney Organising Committee did."

Host city selection

Sydney won the right to host the Games on 24 September 1993, after being selected over Beijing, Berlin, Istanbul and Manchester in four rounds of voting, at the 101st IOC Session in Monte Carlo, Monaco. The Australian city of Melbourne who also hosted the 1956 Summer Olympics had lost out to Atlanta for the 1996 Summer Olympics three years earlier. Beijing would later be selected to host the 2008 Summer Olympics eight years later on 13 July 2001 and the 2022 Winter Olympics twenty-two years later on 31 July 2015. Beijing's loss to Sydney was seen as a "significant blow" to an "urgent political priority" of the Chinese Communist Party leadership having mounted the most intense and expensive candidacy campaign at the date so far(this include the Summer and Winter Games). Although it is unknown as two members of the International Olympic Committee voted for Sydney over Beijing in 1993, it appears that an important role was played by Human Rights Watch's campaign to "stop Beijing" because of China's human rights record and international isolation following the 1989 Tiananmen Square protests. Many in China were angry at what they saw as U.S.-led interference in the vote, and the outcome contributed to rising anti-Western sentiment in China and a new phase at the tensions in Sino-American relations.

Costs
The Oxford Olympics Study 2016 estimates the outturn cost of the Sydney 2000 Summer Olympics at US$5 billion in 2015-dollars and cost overrun at 90% in real terms. This includes sports-related costs only, that is, (i) operational costs incurred by the organising committee for the purpose of staging the Games, e.g., expenditures for technology, transportation, workforce, administration, security, catering, ceremonies, and medical services, and (ii) direct capital costs incurred by the host city and country or private investors to build, e.g., the competition venues, the Olympic village, international broadcast centre, and media and press centre, which are required to host the Games. Indirect capital costs are not included, such as for road, rail, or airport infrastructure, or for hotel upgrades or other business investment incurred in preparation for the Games but not directly related to staging the Games. The cost for Sydney 2000 compares with a cost of US$4.6 billion for Rio 2016, US$40–44 billion for Beijing 2008 and US$51 billion for Sochi 2014, the most expensive Olympics in history. The average cost for the Summer Games since 1960 is US$5.2 billion, average cost overrun is 176%.

In 2000, the Auditor-General of New South Wales reported that the Sydney Games cost A$6.6 billion, with a net cost to the public between A$1.7 and A$2.4 billion. In the years leading up to the games, funds were shifted from education and health programs to cover Olympic expenses.

It has been estimated that the economic impact of the 2000 Olympics was that A$2.1 billion has been shaved from public consumption. Economic growth was not stimulated to a net benefit and in the years after 2000, foreign tourism to NSW grew by less than tourism to Australia as a whole. A "multiplier" effect on broader economic development was not realised, as a simple "multiplier" analysis fails to capture is that resources have to be redirected from elsewhere: the building of a stadium is at the expense of other public works such as extensions to hospitals. Building sporting venues does not add to the aggregate stock of productive capital in the years following the Games: "Equestrian centres, softball compounds and man-made rapids are not particularly useful beyond their immediate function."

Many venues that were constructed in Sydney Olympic Park failed financially in the years immediately following the Olympics to meet the expected bookings to meet upkeep expenses. It was only the 2003 Rugby World Cup which reconnected the park back to citizens. In recent years, infrastructure costs for some facilities have been of growing concern to the NSW Government, especially facilities in Western Sydney. Proposed metro and light rail links from Olympic Park to Parramatta have been estimated to cost in the same order of magnitude as the public expenditure on the games. Stadium Australia had been considered for demolition in 2017 by then NSW Premier Gladys Berejiklian, citing that the stadium was "built for an Olympics" but not for modern spectators. The plan was scrapped in 2020 during the COVID-19 pandemic. The Dunc Gray Velodrome has also struggled to keep up its $500,000 per year maintenance costs, although it is still used for track cycling events.

Chronological summary of the 2000 Summer Olympics

Preliminary matches
Although the Opening Ceremony was not scheduled until 15 September, the football competitions began with preliminary matches on 13 September. Among the pre-ceremony fixtures, host nation Australia lost 1–0 to Italy at the Melbourne Cricket Ground, which was the main stadium for the 1956 Melbourne Olympics.

Day 1: 15 September

Cultural display highlights

The opening ceremony began with a tribute to the Australian pastoral heritage of the Australian stockmen and the importance of the stock horse in Australia's heritage. It was produced and filmed by the Sydney Olympic Broadcasting Organisation and the home nation broadcaster Channel 7. This was introduced by lone rider Steve Jefferys and his rearing Australian Stock Horse Ammo. At the cracking of Jefferys' stockwhip, a further 120 riders entered the stadium, their stock horses performing intricate steps, including forming the five Olympic Rings, to a special Olympics version of the theme, which Bruce Rowland had previously composed for the 1982 film The Man from Snowy River.

The Australian National Anthem was sung, the first verse by Human Nature and the second by Julie Anthony.

The ceremony continued, showing many aspects of the land and its people: the affinity of the mainly coastal-dwelling Australians with the sea that surrounds the "Island Continent". The indigenous occupation of the land, the coming of the First Fleet, the continued immigration from many nations and the rural industry on which the economy of the nation was built, including a display representing the harshness of rural life based on the paintings of Sir Sidney Nolan. Two memorable scenes were the representation of the "Heart" of the country by 200 Aboriginal women from Central Australia who danced up "the mighty spirit of God to protect the Games" and the overwhelmingly noisy representation of the construction industry by hundreds of tap-dancing teenagers.

Because Bibi Salisachs (the wife of IOC President Juan Antonio Samaranch) was seriously ill and unable to accompany her husband to the Olympics, Dawn Fraser, former Australian Olympic Champion swimmer and member of the Parliament of New South Wales, accompanied Samaranch during the Australian cultural display, explaining to him some of the cultural references that are unfamiliar to non-Australians.

Formal presentation
A record 199 nations entered the stadium, with a record 80 of them winning at least one medal. The only missing IOC member was Afghanistan, who was banned due to the extremist rule of the Taliban's oppression of women and its prohibition of sports. The ceremony featured a unified entrance by the athletes of North and South Korea, using a specially designed unification flag: a white background flag with a blue map of the Korean Peninsula. Four athletes from East Timor also marched in the parade of nations as individual Olympic athletes and marched directly before the host country. Although the country-to-be had no National Olympic Committee then, they were allowed to compete under the Olympic Flag with country code IOA. The Governor-General, Sir William Deane, opened the games.

The Olympic Flag was carried around the arena by eight former Australian Olympic champions: Bill Roycroft, Murray Rose, Liane Tooth, Gillian Rolton, Marjorie Jackson, Lorraine Crapp, Michael Wenden and Nick Green. During the raising of the Olympics Flag, the Olympic Hymn was sung by the Millennium Choir of the Greek Orthodox Archdiocese of Australia in Greek. Following this, Tina Arena sang a purpose-written pop song, The Flame.

The opening ceremony concluded with the lighting of the Olympic Flame, which was brought into the stadium by former Australian Olympic champion Herb Elliott. Then, celebrating 100 years of women's participation in the Olympic Games, former Australian women Olympic medalists Betty Cuthbert and Raelene Boyle, Dawn Fraser, Shirley Strickland (later Shirley Strickland de la Hunty), Shane Gould and Debbie Flintoff-King brought the torch through the stadium, handing it over to Cathy Freeman, who lit the flame in the cauldron within a circle of fire. The  choice of Freeman, an Aboriginal woman, to light the flame was notable given the history of human rights abuses against Aboriginal people in Australia. Following her lighting, Freeman was the subject of racial abuse from some Australians. The planned spectacular climax to the ceremony was delayed by the technical glitch of a computer switch which malfunctioned, causing the sequence to shut down by giving a false reading. This meant that the Olympic flame was suspended in mid-air for about four minutes rather than immediately rising up a water-covered ramp to the top of the stadium. When the cause of the problem was discovered, the program was overridden and the cauldron continued its course, and the ceremony concluded with a fireworks display.

Day 2: 16 September

The first medals of the Games were awarded in the women's 10 metre air rifle competition, which was won by Nancy Johnson of the United States.

The Triathlon made its Olympic debut with the women's race. Set in the surroundings of the Sydney Opera House, Brigitte McMahon representing Switzerland swam, cycled and ran to the first gold medal in the sport, beating the favoured home athletes such as Michelie Jones who won silver. McMahon only passed Jones in sight of the finish line.

The first star of the Games was 17-year-old Australian Ian Thorpe, who first set a new world record in the 400-metre freestyle final before competing in an exciting 4 × 100 m freestyle final. Swimming the last leg, Thorpe passed the leading American team and arrived in a new world record time, two-tenths of a second ahead of the Americans. In the same event for women, the Americans also broke the world record, finishing ahead of the Netherlands and Sweden.

Samaranch had to leave for home, as his wife was severely ill. Upon arrival, his wife had already died. Samaranch returned to Sydney four days later. The Olympic flag was flown at half-staff during the period as a sign of respect to Samaranch's wife.

Day 3: 17 September
Canadian Simon Whitfield sprinted away in the last 100 metres of the men's triathlon, becoming the inaugural winner in the event.

On the cycling track, Robert Bartko beat fellow German Jens Lehmann in the individual pursuit, setting a new Olympic Record. Leontien Zijlaard-van Moorsel set a world record in the semi-finals the same event for women.

In the swimming pool, American Tom Dolan beat the world record in the 400-metre medley, successfully defending the title he won in Atlanta four years prior. Dutchwoman Inge de Bruijn also clocked a new world record, beating her own time in the 100 m butterfly final to win by more than a second.

Day 4: 18 September
The main event for the Australians on the fourth day of the Games was the 200 m freestyle. Dutchman Pieter van den Hoogenband had broken the world record in the semi-finals, taking it from the new Australian hero Ian Thorpe, who came close to the world record in his semi-final heat. As the final race finished, Van den Hoogenband's time was exactly the same as in the semi-finals, finishing ahead of Thorpe by half a second.

China won the gold medal in the men's team all-around gymnastics competition after being the runner-up in the previous two Olympics. The other medals were taken by Ukraine and Russia, respectively.

Zijlaard-van Moorsel lived up to the expectations set by her world record in cycling in the semis by winning the gold medal.

Day 7: 21 September
During the Women's Gymnastics All-Around, female athletes suffered damning scores and injuries due to improperly installed gymnastics equipment. Gymnasts performing on the vault gave uncharacteristically poor performances and fell. Officials blamed the series of falls and low scores on performance anxiety. It wasn't until Australian gymnast Allana Slater and her coach, Peggy Liddick, voiced concerns about the equipment that officials discovered the apparatus was five centimetres, or almost two inches, lower than it should've been. While athletes were given the opportunity to perform again, for some of them, the damage to their mental or physical health caused by the vault was irreparable. Chinese gymnast Kui Yuanyuan and American gymnast Kristen Maloney both injured their legs while attempting to stick their landings, with Kui needing to be carried to an examination area and Maloney damaging a titanium rod that had recently been implanted in her shin. Romanian gymnast Andreea Răducan ultimately took gold while her teammates, Simona Amânar and Maria Olaru took silver and bronze, respectively.

Day 9: 23 September
By rowing in the winning coxless four, Steve Redgrave of Great Britain became a member of a select group who had won gold medals at five consecutive Olympics.

The swimming 4 x 100-metre medley relay of B.J. Bedford, Megan Quann (Jendrick), Jenny Thompson and Dara Torres became the first women's relay under 4-minutes, swimming 3:58 and setting a world record, claiming the gold medal for the United States.

Day 10: 24 September
Rulon Gardner, never an NCAA champion or a world medalist, beat Alexander Karelin of Russia to win gold in the super heavyweight class, Greco-Roman wrestling. Karelin had won gold in Seoul, Barcelona and Atlanta. Before this fight, he had never lost in international competition, had been unbeaten in all competitions in 13 years, and had not surrendered a point in a decade.

Day 11: 25 September

Australian Cathy Freeman won the 400-metre final in front of a jubilant Sydney crowd at the Olympic Stadium, ahead of Lorraine Graham of Jamaica and Katharine Merry of Great Britain. Freeman's win made her the first competitor in Olympic Games history to light the Olympic Flame and then go on to win a Gold Medal. The attendance at the stadium was 112,524 – the largest attendance for any sport in Olympic Games history.

In a men's basketball pool match between the United States and France, the USA's Vince Carter made one of the most famous dunks in basketball history. After getting the ball off a steal, the 6'6"/1.98 m Carter drove to the basket, with 7'2"/2.18 m centre Frédéric Weis in his way. Carter jumped, spread his legs in midair, scraped Weis' head on the way up, and dunked. The French media dubbed the feat le dunk de la mort ("the dunk of death").

Day 14: 28 September
The Canadian flag at the athletes' village was lowered to half-mast as Canadian athletes paid tribute to the former prime minister Pierre Trudeau after hearing of his death in Montreal (because of the time zone difference, it was 29 September in Sydney when Trudeau died). The Canadian flag was flown at half-mast for the remainder of the Olympics, on orders from both IOC President Juan Antonio Samaranch and Canadian Foreign Affairs Minister Lloyd Axworthy, as the state funeral did not take place until 3 October, two days after the closing ceremony, and the Canadian athletes subsequently rushed back to attend his funeral after 1 October.

Day 16: 30 September
Cameroon won a historic gold medal over Spain in the Men's Olympic Football Final at the Olympic Stadium. The game went to a penalty shootout, which was won by Cameroon 5–3.

Day 17: 1 October

The last event of the games was the Men's Marathon, contested on a course that started in North Sydney. The event was won by Ethiopian Gezahegne Abera, with Kenyan Erick Wainaina second, and Tesfaye Tola, also of Ethiopia, third. It was the first time since the 1968 Olympics that an Ethiopian won the gold medal in this event.

The closing ceremony commenced with Christine Anu performing her version of the Warumpi Band's song "My Island Home", with several Aboriginal dancers atop the Geodome Stage in the middle of the stadium, around which several hundred umbrella and lamp box kids created an image of Aboriginal Dreamtime. The Geodome Stage was used throughout the ceremony, which was a flat stage mechanically raised into the shape of a Geode.

IOC President Juan Antonio Samaranch declared at the Closing Ceremony,

Subsequent Summer Olympics held in Athens, Beijing and London have been described by Samaranch's successor Jacques Rogge as "unforgettable, dream Games", "truly exceptional" and "happy and glorious games" respectively – the practice of declaring games the "best ever" having been retired after the 2000 Games.

Sports
The 2000 Summer Olympic programme featured 300 events in the following 28 sports:

Although demonstration sports were abolished following the 1992 Summer Olympics, the Sydney Olympics featured wheelchair racing as exhibition events on the athletics schedule.

Special quarantine conditions were introduced to allow entry of horses into Australia to participate in equestrian events, avoiding the need for such events to take place elsewhere as had happened at the 1956 Summer Olympics in Melbourne.

Calendar

Medal count

These are the top ten nations that won medals in the 2000 Games.

The ranking in this table is based on information provided by the International Olympic Committee. Some other sources may be inconsistent due to not taking into account all later doping cases.

 Host nation (Australia)

Participating National Olympic Committees

199 National Olympic Committees (NOCs) participated in the Sydney Games, two more than in the 1996 Summer Olympics; in addition, there were four Timorese Individual Olympic Athletes at the 2000 Summer Olympics. Eritrea, the Federated States of Micronesia and Palau made their Olympic debut this year.

Democratic Republic of the Congo was once again designated under that name, after it participated as Zaire from 1984 to 1996.

Afghanistan was the only 1996 participant (and the only existing NOC) that did not participate in the 2000 Olympics, having been banned due to the Taliban's totalitarian rule in Afghanistan, their oppression of women, and its prohibition of sports.

Venues

Sydney Olympic Park

Stadium Australia: Ceremonies (opening/closing), Athletics, Football (final)
Sydney International Aquatic Centre: Diving, Modern Pentathlon (swimming) Swimming, Synchronised Swimming, Water Polo (medal events)
State Sports Centre: Table Tennis, Taekwondo
NSW Tennis Centre: Tennis
State Hockey Centre: Field Hockey
The Dome and Exhibition Complex: Badminton, Basketball, Gymnastics (rhythmic), Handball (final), Modern Pentathlon (fencing, shooting), Volleyball (indoor)
Sydney SuperDome: Gymnastics (artistic, trampoline), Basketball (final)
Sydney Baseball Stadium: Baseball, Modern Pentathlon (riding, running)
Sydney International Archery Park: Archery

Sydney

Sydney Convention & Exhibition Centre: Boxing, Fencing, Judo, Weightlifting, Wrestling
Sydney Entertainment Centre: Volleyball (indoor final)
Dunc Gray Velodrome: Cycling (track)
Sydney International Shooting Centre: Shooting
Sydney International Equestrian Centre: Equestrian
Sydney International Regatta Centre: Rowing, Canoeing (sprint)
Blacktown Olympic Centre: Baseball, Softball
Western Sydney Parklands: Cycling (mountain biking)
Ryde Aquatic Leisure Centre: Water Polo
Penrith Whitewater Stadium: Canoeing (slalom)
Bondi Beach: Volleyball (beach)
Sydney Football Stadium: Football
Olympic Sailing Shore Base: Sailing
Centennial Parklands: Cycling (road)
Marathon course: Athletics (marathon)
North Sydney: Athletics (marathon start)
Sydney Opera House: Triathlon.

Outside Sydney
Canberra Stadium, Canberra: Football
Hindmarsh Stadium, Adelaide: Football
Melbourne Cricket Ground: Football
The Gabba (Brisbane Cricket Ground), Brisbane: Football

Organisation

Organisations responsible for the Olympics
A number of quasi-government bodies were responsible for the construction, organisation and execution of the Sydney Games. These included:
the Sydney Organising Committee for the Olympic Games (SOCOG), primarily responsible for the staging of the Games
Olympic Coordination Authority (OCA), primarily responsible for construction and oversight
Olympic Roads & Transport Authority (ORTA)
Olympic Security Command Centre (OSCC)
Olympic Intelligence Centre (OIC)
JTF Gold the Australian Defence Force Joint Taskforce Gold
Sydney Olympic Broadcasting Organisation (nominally part of SOCOG)
IBM, provider of technology and the Technical Command Centre
Telstra, provider of telecommunications
Great Big Events, event management and marketing

These organisations worked closely together and with other bodies such as:
the International Olympic Committee (IOC)
the Australian Olympic Committee (AOC)
the other 197 National Olympic Committees (NOCs)
the 33 International Sports Federations (IFs)
all three levels of Australian government (federal, state and local)
dozens of official sponsor and hundreds of official supplier companies

These bodies are often collectively referred to as the "Olympic Family".

Organisation of the Paralympics
The organisation of the 2000 Summer Paralympics was the responsibility of the Sydney Paralympic Organising Committee (SPOC). However, much of the planning and operation of the Paralympic Games was outsourced to SOCOG such that most operational programmes planned both the Olympic and Paralympic Games.

Other Olympic events
The organisation of the Games included not only the actual sporting events, but also the management (and sometimes construction) of the sporting venues and surrounding precincts, the organisation of the Sydney Olympic Arts Festival, and the Olympic torch relay, which began in Greece and travelled to Australia via numerous Oceania island nations.

Phases of the Olympic project
The staging of the Olympics were treated as a project on a vast scale, broken into several broad phases:
1993 to 1996 – positioning
1997 – going operational
1998 – procurement/venuisation
1999 – testing/refinement
2000 – implementation
2001 – post-implementation and wind-down

SOCOG organisational design
The internal organisation of SOCOG evolved over the phases of the project and changed, sometimes radically, several times.

In late 1998, the design was principally functional. The top two tiers below the CEO Sandy Hollway consisted of five groups (managed by Group General Managers and the Deputy CEO) and twenty divisions (managed by divisional General Managers), which in turn were further broken up into programmes and sub-programmes or projects.

In 1999, functional areas (FAs) broke up into geographic precinct and venue teams (managed by Precinct Managers and Venue Managers) with functional area staff reporting to both the FA manager and the venue manager. SOCOG moved to a matrix structure. The Interstate Football division extant in 1998 was the first of these geographically based venue teams.

Volunteer program
The origins of the volunteer program for Sydney 2000 dates back to the bid, as early as 1992.

On 17 December 1992, a group of Sydney citizens interested in the prospect of hosting the 2000 Olympic and Paralympic Games gathered for a meeting at Sports House at Wentworth Park in Sydney.

In the period leading up to 1999, after Sydney had won the bid, the small group of volunteers grew from approximately 42 to around 500. These volunteers became known as Pioneer Volunteers. The Pioneer Volunteer program was managed internally by SOCOG's Volunteer Services Department in consultation with prominent peak groups like The Centre for Volunteering (Volunteering and TAFE. Some of the Pioneer Volunteers still meet every four months, an unseen legacy of the games which brought together a community spirit not seen before.

During the Olympic games, tens of thousands of volunteers (the official figure placed at 46,967) helped everywhere at the Olympic venues and elsewhere in the city. They were honoured with a parade like the athletes had a few days before.

Marketing

Official logo
The bid logo was introduced in 1992 and created by architect and designer Michael Bryce. It featured a colourful, stylised image of the Sydney Opera House which is a possible reference to the motif of the rainbow serpent. 

The official logo was revealed in 1996, and is also referred to as the "Millennium Man".  It incorporated similar curves to the bid logo and combined them with a stylised image of a runner to form a torchbearer in motion. The image of the runner s composed of  two small yellow boomerangs for arms and a larger red boomerang for legs. Over the runner's head is a trail of smoke that represents the arches of the Sydney Opera House.

The design process of the official logo, as well as all other aspects of the Olympic Games' visual design identity, was awarded to Melbourne design studio FHA Image Design. The Sydney Olympics brand identity project officially started in 1993, and lasted 7 years. It was also up to FHA Design to prepare the visual identity of the Paralympic Games and this also absorbed some elements as the identification signals and the pictograms.

Mascots

The official mascots chosen for the 2000 Summer Olympics were Syd the platypus, Millie the echidna, and Olly the kookaburra, designed by Matthew Hattan and Jozef Szekeres and named by Philip Sheldon of agency Weekes Morris Osborn in response to the original SOCOG recommendation of Murray, Margery, and Dawn after famous Australian athletes.

There was also Fatso the Fat-Arsed Wombat, an unofficial mascot popularised by comedy team Roy Slaven and HG Nelson on the TV series The Dream with Roy and HG. Roy and HG also frequently disparaged the official mascots on their television program.

Sponsors

Medals and bouquets
A total of 750 gold, 750 silver and 780 bronze medals were minted for the Games. The gold and silver medals contained 99.99 percent of pure silver. The bronze medals were 99 percent bronze with one percent silver, they were made by melting down Australian one-cent and two-cent coins, which had been removed from circulation from 1992 onward.

The bouquets handed to medal recipients incorporated foliage from the Grevillea baileyana, also known as the white oak.

Awards and commendations
The International Olympic Committee awarded Sydney and its inhabitants with the "Pierre de Coubertin Trophy" in recognition of the collaboration and happiness shown by the people of Sydney during the event to all the athletes and visitors around the world.

After the games' end, the New South Wales Police Force was granted use of the Olympic Rings in a new commendation and citation as the IOC consideration after having staged the "safest" games ever.

Mo Awards
The Australian Entertainment Mo Awards (commonly known informally as the Mo Awards), were annual Australian entertainment industry awards. They recognise achievements in live entertainment in Australia from 1975 to 2016.
 (wins only)
|-
| 2000 Summer
| Olympic Games Opening Ceremony
| Special Event of the Year 
| 
|-

In popular culture
In F.J. Campbell's 2018 novel No Number Nine, the last part of the book is set at the Sydney 2000 Olympics.

In Tom Clancy's thriller Rainbow Six and its video game adaptation, the 2000 Olympic Games are the setting of a plot by eco-terrorists, who plan to use the games in order to spread a terrible new plague throughout the world.

In Morris Gleitzman's children's book Toad Rage, a cane toad travels to Sydney in a bid to become the Olympic mascot.

The Games was a mockumentary television series run on the ABC network, with two seasons that ran in 1998 and 2000. The series satirized corruption and cronyism in the Olympic movement, bureaucratic ineptness in the New South Wales public service, and unethical behaviour within politics and the media. An unusual feature of the show was that the characters shared the same name as the actors who played them.

See also

The Games of the XXVII Olympiad 2000: Music from the Opening Ceremony
Aussie Aussie Aussie, Oi Oi Oi
John Coates
Use of performance-enhancing drugs in the Olympic Games – Sydney 2000

Notes

References

External links

2000 Summer Olympics Official site
Official Report Vol. 1, Vol. 2, Vol. 3

2000 Summer Olympics – collection of archived websites
Sydney Olympic Games Information
Sydney Olympic Park
Sydney Olympic Games, 2000 – Australian Government
Sydney 2000 Games Collection at the Powerhouse Museum  – information and audio files

Spirit of Sydney Volunteers Website – Website maintained by and for Sydney 2000 Volunteer Alumni
Official 10th Anniversary Volunteers Website – Official 10th Anniversary Volunteers Website

 
2000 in Australian sport
2000 in multi-sport events
International sports competitions hosted at Sydney Olympic Park
September 2000 sports events in Australia
October 2000 sports events in Australia
2000s in Sydney